The Yawarrawarrka (also written Yawarawarka, Jauraworka) were an in Indigenous people of South Australia.

Country
Their eastern extension penetrated the sandhills east of Goyder Lagoon, running up to roughly Arrabury. Their southeasterly frontier was close to Innamincka, though the Ngurawola also claimed this area.

Alternative names
 Jauroworka,, Yarrawaurka, Yarrawurka
 Yauroka
 Yauarawaka, Yarroworka
 Jaurorka, Yaurorka, Yarawuarka
 Yerawaka, Yowerawoolka, Yowerawarrika..

Some words
 mulla (tame dog).
 anya (father).
 umma (mother).

Notes

Citations

Sources

Aboriginal peoples of South Australia